Cairistìona is a Scottish Gaelic female given name meaning Christian. The English equivalent is Christina. The name originates in the Scottish Highlands. There is a traditional song about Cairistiona, which is about a lost love. The name is rare, but usually used by Gaelic-speaking families. The equivalent in Irish is Crístíona.

Bearers of the name

Cairistìona

 Cairistìona Nic Ruaidhrí, Scottish Noblewoman

References